Graffiti Crimes was the debut studio album by New Zealand new wave music group Mi-Sex, released in July 1979. The album peaked at number six on the New Zealand albums chart and number 16 on the Australian Kent Music Report. the album was certified Gold in New Zealand.

The album was re-released in January 1980 following the success of the single "Computer Games", which peaked at number one in Australia in November 1979. "Computer Games" was added to the track listing on track 1, Side Two.

The album was titled Computer Games for the international release.

Kevin Stanton said it is his hand holding the policeman's notebook on the cover of the album and his then girlfriend posing by the wall.

Reception

Luis Feliu of The Canberra Times felt "The songs are all well rounded with a beginning, middle and end, and pulsating rhythms for the colourful lyrics to bounce off. Hardly any time wasted between cuts too, straight into the next song. Naturally, this sort of music has to be played at a gutsy volume level."

Track listing

Charts

Weekly charts

Year-end charts

Certifications

References

Mi-Sex albums
CBS Records albums
1979 debut albums